George Morris Boone  (March 1, 1871 – September 24, 1910) was a Major League Baseball pitcher. He played in the majors for the Louisville Colonels of the American Association during the 1891 season.

In 1910, Boone died from an accidental overdose of medication taken to relieve insomnia.

External links

1871 births
1910 deaths
Major League Baseball pitchers
Baseball players from Louisville, Kentucky
19th-century baseball players
Louisville Colonels players
Memphis (minor league baseball) players
Mobile (minor league baseball) players
Fort Wayne (minor league baseball) players
Accidental deaths in Kentucky
Drug-related deaths in Kentucky